Cejwin Camps was a Jewish summer camp in the Catskill Mountains, established in 1919 by the Central Jewish Institute. At its height it was "the most significant non-Hebrew Jewish cultural camp."

History
The camp was founded in 1919 by the Central Jewish Institute, an independent Jewish community center in Manhattan, as a two-week vacation home for needy Talmud Torah students. After its second summer, it was expanded into an educational residential camp under the leadership of the Institute's director, Dr. Albert P. Schoolman, a disciple of Samson Benderly. A permanent site for the camp on Martin's Lake near Port Jervis, New York was purchased in 1923, and opened the following July.

Cejwin's Jewish practice was influenced by the Reconstructionist outlooks of Rabbis Mordecai Kaplan and Ira Eisenstein, both of whom frequently visited the camp. Its initial program included Hebrew and Judaica classes alongside recreational camp activities like music and arts and crafts. Though formal instruction was abandoned during the Great Depression, Schoolman continued to promote Hebrew and Judaism through informal education.

The camp's name was changed from Central Jewish Institute Camps to Cejwin Camps in 1933. 

Cejwin consisted of seven camps, divided by age groups: three for boys (Hadar, Carmel and Aviv), three for girls (Hadas, Carmela and Aviva), and one co-ed  (Yonim, the youngest). In the 1970s, Yonim was divided into Junior Hadar and Junior Hadas.

Legacy
As one of the first Jewish cultural camps in the United States, Cejwin Camps was highly influential in the camping movement. The founders of Camp Ramah, one of whom had previously attended Cejwin, were inspired by the camp's model, while Schoolman himself went on to help found Camp Modin in Maine.

Notable alumni and staff
 Sylvia Ettenberg
 Temima Gezari
 Ellen Greene
 Sydney Taylor
 Marvin Terban

References

External links
 
  

1919 establishments in New York (state)
1991 disestablishments in New York (state)
Educational institutions established in 1919
Jewish summer camps in New York (state)
Port Jervis, New York
Reconstructionist Judaism in the United States